Ventor can refer to 

 Jürgen "Ventor" Reil, the drummer of Kreator
 Bentor, also called Ventor

See also 
 Ventnor (disambiguation)